Salicornia rubra, the Rocky Mountain glasswort, is a species of flowering plant in the family Amaranthaceae. It is native to colder or higher areas of North America; the Yukon, Nunavut, British Columbia, Alberta, Saskatchewan, Manitoba, and Ontario in Canada, and the western and north-central US. It has been introduced to Quebec and Michigan, and has gone extinct in Illinois. A halophyte, it is one of the most salt-tolerant plants of North America.

References

rubra
Halophytes
Flora of Yukon
Flora of Nunavut
Flora of Western Canada
Flora of Ontario
Flora of the Northwestern United States
Flora of Nevada
Flora of Utah
Flora of New Mexico
Flora of North Dakota
Flora of South Dakota
Flora of Nebraska
Flora of Kansas
Flora of Minnesota
Flora of Iowa
Plants described in 1899
Flora without expected TNC conservation status